Sievierodonetsk, Siverodonetsk or Severodonetsk is a city in Luhansk Oblast, Ukraine occupied by Russia . Sievierodonetsk faces neighbouring city Lysychansk across the river. The city, whose name comes from the above-mentioned river, had a 2022 population of  making it then the second most populous city in the oblast. Since June 2022, it has been militarily occupied and administered by the Russian Federation. As of 2023, much of the city is in ruins due to war.

Prior to the war, Sievierodonetsk had several factories and a significant chemical production centre "Azot", part of the Ostchem group. There was also an airport  to the south of the city.

From 2014 until 2022, Sievierodonetsk served as the administrative centre of Luhansk Oblast, due to the city of Luhansk falling under the control of the Luhansk People's Republic in early 2014, during the war in Donbas. As part of the 2022 Russian invasion of Ukraine, Sievierodonetsk came under heavy attack from Russian forces and was the forefront of the Battle of Donbas, resulting in extensive destruction to the city, including residential areas. By 25 June 2022, the city was completely captured by Russian and separatist forces, with Ukrainian authorities claiming that the civilian population was approximately 10,000, ten percent of its pre-war level.

History

Soviet era 
The foundation of modern Sievierodonetsk is closely connected with the beginning of construction of the Lysychansk Nitrogen Fertilizer Plant within the limits of Lysychansk, Ukrainian SSR, Soviet Union in 1934. Donets itself was already combined with Lysychansk. The first settlement of workers on the construction site was called Lyskhimstroi, near Donets. In September 1935, the first school was opened in the settlement, a silicate brick plant started production, and the first three residential two-story houses were built. In 1940, there were 47 houses, a school, a club, a kindergarten, a nursery, and 10 buildings of a chemical combine in Lyskhimstroi.

During the Second World War, Lyskhimstroi and surrounding areas were occupied by German forces on 11 July 1942. On 1 February 1943, over half a year later, it was retaken by the 41st Guards Rifle Division and 110th Tank Brigade of the Red Army. Work to restore and expand the Lysychansk Nitrogen Fertilizer Plant began on 10 December 1943 and by 1946, the pre-war housing stock was completely restored, which amounted to 17,000 square meters.

A domestic airport south of the Lyskhimstroi began operations in May 1948, it would undergo major renovations during the early 1960s.

Four new names were proposed for the settlement in 1950: Svetlograd, Komsomolsk-on-Donets, Mendeleevsk and Severodonetsk. It was renamed Severodonetsk, after the Siverskyi Donets River. Severodonetsk would receive the status of an urban settlement the same year. On 1 January 1951, the Lysychansk Nitrogen Fertilizer Plant would produce its first output of ammonium nitrate.

A local newspaper starting publishing in the city in April 1965.

Independent Ukraine

War in Donbas 

In the war in Donbas, the town was captured in late May 2014 by combined pro-Russian forces, who totaled up to 1,000. A small number of locals supported the Russian-backed forces, but most residents say they suffered extortion, violence and intolerance under a "reign of terror." No Ukrainian presidential election in 2014 was held in the city as the separatists did not allow the voting places to open and much of Election Commission's property was either stolen or destroyed. On 22 July 2014, Ukrainian forces regained control of the city. Heavy fighting continued around the city for a number of days; on 23 July 2014 the National Guard of Ukraine and the Ukrainian Army released a statement that said they were "continuing the cleansing of Sievierodonetsk".

A bridge across Siverskyi Donets river was severely damaged during the war in 2014; it was re-opened in December 2016. The European Union contributed 93.8% of the funding for the restoration.

In 2016, there was a proposal in Ukraine's parliament, the Verkhovna Rada, to rename the city Siverskodonetsk, changing the Russian exonym to a native Ukrainian version with the same meaning.

2022 Russian invasion 

During the larger Battle of Donbas of the 2022 Russian invasion of Ukraine, Sievierodonetsk became the center of intense fighting and media attention. In May, Russian forces made Sievierdonetsk its major focus in an attempt to capture Luhansk Oblast. On 31 May, the city's mayor stated that Russian forces had seized control of half of the city. By 14 June, Russian forces had control of 80% of the city and had cut off all escape routes. On 24 June, the Ukrainian government ordered its forces to withdraw from Sievierodonetsk.

On 26 June, Russian Defense Minister Spokesman Lieutenant General Igor Konashenkov stated the LNR People's Militia and Russian Armed Forces had "completely liberated the cities of Severodonetsk and Borovskoye as well as populated localities Voronovo and Sirotino in the Lugansk People's Republic".

Demographics

Ethnicity of the city's residents as of the 2001 census:
Ukrainians: 59%
Russians: 38.7% 
Belarusians: 0.6% 
Other: 1.7%

Economy
Chemical industries formerly active in Sievierdonetsk include:
"Azot" – one of the largest chemical plants in Europe.
Khimpostavschik, a private enterprise
Himexele

Sports
The first Ukrainian championship in bandy was held in Sievierodonetsk in February 2012. Azot Severodonetsk, a bandy club based in the city, came out victorious in the tournament.

Sister cities
Sievierodonetsk is twinned with the following municipalities:
 Jelenia Góra, Poland
 Rivne, Ukraine

Notable people
Notable residents of Sievierodonetsk include:
Irina Antanasijević (born 1965), Russo-Serbian philologist, literary critic and translator
Nikolay Davydenko (born 1981), retired professional tennis player
Pavel Gubarev (born 1983), former head of the Donetsk People's Republic
Serhiy Haidai (born 1975), entrepreneur and current head of the Luhansk Regional Military–Civil Administration
Yuriy Hritsyna (born 1971), professional football coach and former player
Yosip Kurlat (1927-2000), children's writer and translator
Snejana Onopka (born 1986), Ukrainian fashion model
Valentin Pukhalsky (1887-1981), Soviet sculptor
Borys Romanov (born 1949), graphic design artist 
Kurt Schmid (born 1942), Austrian conductor and composer 
Dmytro Semenenko (born 1988), Ukrainian powerlifter
Svitlana Talan (born 1960), novelist

Notes

References

External links

 
 City portal

 
Cities in Luhansk Oblast
Destroyed cities
Donets
Populated places established in the Ukrainian Soviet Socialist Republic
Populated places established in 1934
1934 establishments in Ukraine
Territorial disputes of Ukraine
Cities of regional significance in Ukraine
Sievierodonetsk Raion